Geotrupes spiniger  is a species of earth-boring dung beetles native to Europe.

References

External links
Ecology of Commanster

Geotrupidae
Beetles described in 1802
Beetles of Europe